The CalArts Center for New Performance (CNP) is the professional producing arm of the California Institute of the Arts. It provides a unique artist- and project-driven framework for the development and realization of original theater, music, dance, media, and interdisciplinary projects. Extending the progressive work carried out at CalArts into a direct dialogue with professional communities at the local, national, and international levels, CNP offers an alternative model to support emerging directions in the performing arts. It also enables CalArts students to work shoulder-to-shoulder with celebrated artists and acquire a level of experience that goes beyond their curriculum. Transformative artists from around the world develop work with CNP that expands the language, discourse, and boundaries of contemporary theater and performance, infusing their work with the talent, vitality, and impulses of emerging artists in the CalArts community.

Founded in 2002 by Susan Solt, Travis Preston, and Carol Bixler and launched with Travis Preston’s groundbreaking all female production of King Lear, and originally called the CalArts Center for New Theater, the name was changed in 2005 to reflect the expanded mission, aspiration, and embrace of the larger performance landscape.

Projects

Leadership
 Travis Preston, ExecutiveArtistic Director, Dean/CalArts School of Theater
 Rachel Scandling, Producing Director
 Marissa Chibás, Director of Duende CalArts; Producing Artist
 Daniel Alexander Jones, Producing Artist
 Amanda Shank, Associate Artistic Director
 Chi-wang Yang, Associate Artistic Director
 Paul Turbiak, Director of Communications 
 Chris Swetcky, Director of Production
 George Lugg, Consulting Producer

Awards and Accolades
King Lear (2003)
Three NAACP awards including Best Performance by a Female for Fran Bennett as King Lear, Best Production and Best Lighting Design
Five LA Ovation Award Nominations

''Brewsie and Willie'' (2010)
LA Weekly Awards for Best Production Design, Best Original Music, Best Lighting Design

2011 MetLife/TCG A-Ha! Program grant recipient

References

External links
CalArts Center for New Performance
California Institute of the Arts
Roy and Edna Disney/CalArts Theater
CalArts Blog
TEDxCalArts

Theatres in California
Event venues established in 1999
1999 establishments in California